The Office of Hawaiian Affairs (OHA) is a self-governing corporate body of the State of Hawaii created by the 1978 Hawaii State Constitutional Convention.

Background
In 1893, pro-American elements in Hawaii overthrew the monarchy and formed the Republic of Hawaii, which the U.S. annexed in 1898. In 1921, in order to make amends for injustices associated with the overthrow and annexation, the US created the Hawaiian Homes Commissions Act which set aside 200,000 acres of land for the use of homelands for Native Hawaiians of 50% blood quantum or more. It was meant to create some compensation for forced colonization of the indigenous peoples, but in 1959 Hawaii was officially adopted as the fiftieth state of the US, with the Statehood Admissions Act defining "Native Hawaiian" as any person descended from the aboriginal people of Hawaii, living there prior to 1778. The Ceded lands (lands once owned by the Hawaiian kingdom monarchy) were transferred from the federal government to the State of Hawaii for the "betterment of the conditions of the native Hawaiians". In 1978 the Office of Hawaiian Affairs (OHA) was created in response to the growing Hawaiian sovereignty movement of the 1970s to manage that portion of the ceded lands allotted to Hawaiian Homelands, advance the lifestyle of Native Hawaiians, preserve Hawaiian culture and protect Native Hawaiian rights. It was established during the 1978 state constitutional convention Government funding has created programs, schools, scholarships and teaching curriculums through OHA. Many of these organizations, agencies and trusts like OHA, have had a good deal of legal issues over the years. In the US Supreme court case; "Rice v. Cayetano", OHA was accused of violating the fourteenth and fifteenth amendments to the United States constitution with voting provisions that were race based. The court found for the plaintiff that OHA had violated the fifteenth amendment. OHA has also been questioned for programs and services to Hawaiians of less than the fifty percent, required blood quantum (The minimum requirement to qualify for Hawaiian Homelands).

Board of trustees
The Office of Hawaiian Affairs is governed by an elected board of nine trustees.  The constitution provides an outline of that board, "There shall be a board of trustees for the Office of Hawaiian Affairs elected by qualified voters who are Hawaiians, as provided by law. The board members shall be Hawaiians. There shall be not less than nine members of the board of trustees; provided that each of the following Islands have one representative: Oahu, Kauai, Maui, Molokai and Hawaii. The board shall select a chairperson from its members. The board of trustees provision was amended upon a United States Supreme Court ruling in the case of Rice v. Cayetano that non-Hawaiians could not be excluded from the election process, including the right of non-Hawaiians to run for such an office.  Trustees are elected to a four-year term by general election of Hawaii registered voters. The board of trustees generally meets twice a month.

The constitution adds, "The board of trustees of the Office of Hawaiian Affairs shall exercise power as provided by law: to manage and administer the proceeds from the sale or other disposition of the lands, natural resources, minerals and income derived from whatever sources for native Hawaiians and Hawaiians, including all income and proceeds from that pro rata portion of the trust referred to in section 4 of this article for native Hawaiians; to formulate policy relating to affairs of native Hawaiians and Hawaiians; and to exercise control over real and personal property set aside by state, federal or private sources and transferred to the board for native Hawaiians and Hawaiians. The board shall have the power to exercise control over the Office of Hawaiian Affairs through its executive officer, the administrator of the Office of Hawaiian Affairs, who shall be appointed by the board. On January 30, 1989 the board of trustees agreed that salaries should be consistent with other departments of the State of Hawaii.

References

 Hawaiian Homes Commission Act, 1920 in the GPO Statute Compilations collection

External links

Native Hawaiian
State agencies of Hawaii
Indigenous affairs ministries
Indigenous land rights in Hawaii
1978 establishments in Hawaii